Giorgos Koulakiotis (born 5 May 1977 in Veria) is a Greek footballer who played as a defender.

Career
He started playing for Veria FC in 1994. Four years later he moved to PAOK, where he played for the next four years. In 2002, he went to Kallithea, when the club was playing in first division of Greek championship. In 2006, he continued to Panthrakikos (club of second division), and one year later he moved to Agrotikos Asteras (also club of second division). In 2008, he moved of Makedonikos, club of third division.

National team
He was a member of Greece national team under 21, which played in the final of the European Championship, in 1998.

Honours
PAOK
Greek Cup: 1 (2001)

Greece national team Under-21
European Championship: Finalist (1998)

References

1977 births
Living people
Greek footballers
Greece under-21 international footballers
Makedonikos F.C. players
Veria F.C. players
Kallithea F.C. players
PAOK FC players
Panthrakikos F.C. players
Super League Greece players
Association football defenders
Footballers from Veria